Mansoura, Algeria is a town and commune in Bordj Bou Arréridj Province, Algeria. According to the 1998 census it has a population of 19,979.

References

Communes of Bordj Bou Arréridj Province
Algeria
Cities in Algeria